Richard Edgar Hanley (November 19, 1894 – December 16, 1970) was an American football player and coach. Hanley played quarterback for Washington State, including in the 1916 Rose Bowl victory over Brown. During his four years at WSU the Cougars were 22-4-1. He is notable for being one of the few players to have played in the Rose Bowl for two different teams. In 1918, he enlisted in the Marine Corps becoming a player/coach and captain for the Marine Island Marines.   He served as the head football coach at Haskell Institute—now known as Haskell Indian Nations University from 1922 to 1926 and at Northwestern University from 1927 to 1934, compiling a career college football coaching record of 83–35–8.  Hanley Reentered the Marine Corps in 1942 and was assigned to Marine Corps Air Station El Toro, California and tasked with devising a combat conditioning program for the Marines training at the air station.  While at MCAS EL Toro he also coached the base football team during the 1944 & 1945 seasons.  Those "Flying Marine" teams went a combined 17-3 during his tenure.  He left the Marine Corps as a lieutenant colonel in March 1946. In 1946, he coached the first three games of the season for the Chicago Rockets of the All-America Football Conference (AAFC).  Hanley died on December 16, 1970, at Stanford University Hospital in Palo Alto, California.

Head coaching record

College

References

External links
 
 

1894 births
1970 deaths
American football halfbacks
American football quarterbacks
El Toro Flying Marines football coaches
Haskell Indian Nations Fighting Indians football coaches
Northwestern Wildcats football coaches
Washington State Cougars football players
Washington Huskies football players
High school football coaches in Oregon
United States Marine Corps personnel of World War I
United States Marine Corps personnel of World War II
United States Marine Corps officers
People from Cloquet, Minnesota
Coaches of American football from Washington (state)
Players of American football from Spokane, Washington
Military personnel from Minnesota